Saad Abdulrahman Albazei is a Saudi intellectual who is known for his critiques of Arabic culture and comparative studies that map the East-West cultural and literary relations.

Life
Albazei was born in Saudi Arabia in 1953. He completed his university education in Riyadh and earned his Ph.D. from Purdue University, in the USA in 1983.

His dissertation dealt with "literary Orientalism" in Western literatures. 
He is currently a member of the Consultative Assembly of Saudi Arabia,. Until recently, he was professor of English and Comparative Literature at the Dept. of English, King Saud University, Riyadh. His former capacities include: editor-in-chief of The Global Arabic Encyclopedia (30 vols.), and editor-in-chief of the Riyadh Daily, an English-speaking newspaper.
Dr. Albazei also worked as president of the Riyadh Literary Club, a major cultural institution in the Saudi Capital from 2006 to 2010. He has since then joined the Shura Council (an appointed Saudi parliamentary body) having retired from his post as professor of English and comparative literature at King Saud University.

Works
He has published widely on Arabic literature, including several volumes of literary criticism and analysis. His book Languages of Poetry: Poems and Readings won the Saudi Ministry of Culture's Book of the Year Prize in 2011. He also edited the 30-volume Global Arabic Encyclopedia. He chaired the judging panel for the 2014 Arabic Booker Prize.

His publications in English include:

 Tension in the House: the Contemporary Poetry of Arabia," World Literature Today (Spring, 2001), Oklahoma, USA: University of Oklahoma.
"Minority Concerns: Female Scholars at the Cultural Intersection," Neither East Nor West: Postcolonial Essays on Literature, Culture and Religion, (Stockholm, Sweden: Sodertorns Hogskola University College, 2008).
"Enlightened Tensions: Jewish Haskalah and Arab-Muslim Nahda," (Göttingen, Germany: Vandenhoeck & Ruprecht, Simon Dubnow Institute Yearbook, 2008).

Forthcoming: Cultural Encounters: Essays on Literature and Culture (in English).

Over the years, Prof. Albazei has lectured and participated in conferences in several countries including: USA, Japan, Poland, Germany, UK, France, Spain, UAE, Bahrain, Oman, Kuwait, Egypt, Algeria, Tunisia. Most recently he addressed the UNESCO conference on languages in Paris, March, 2009.

Prof. Albazei publishes articles in Saudi newspapers as well as academic articles in various periodicals. His English publications have appeared in several journals and books in Arab countries, Germany, Sweden, and the USA. His publications in Arabic include:

 Thaqafat Assahra (Desert Culture), 1991.
 Dalil Annakid Aladabi (A Guide for the Literary Critic), 2002.
 Shurufat lialru'yah (Outposts for Vision: on identity, globalization, and cultural interaction), 2004.
 Almukawin Alyahudi fi Alhadharah Algharbiyyah (the Jewish Component in Western Civilization), 2007. [Reviewed in Foreign Policy journal of the US State Department, Dec. 2008]
 Alikhtilaf Aththaqafi wa Thaqafat Alikhtilaf (Cultural Difference and the Culture of Difference), 2008.
 Sard Almudun: fi Alroyah wa Alsinama (Cities Narrative: Fiction and Cinema), 2009.
 Qalaq al-Ma'rifah (The Anxiety of Knowledge): Thought and Culture Issues (2010).
 Lughat Ashi'r (Languages of Poetry): Poems and Readings (2011).
 Mashaghil Annass and Ishtighal Al-Qira'ah (Preoccupations of the Text and the Workings of Reading) (2014)
 Muajahat Thaqafiyyah/Cultural Encounters (Arabic and English Texts on culture and the Arts) (2014).

Translations into Arabic:

 Muslims in American History (by Jerald Dirx) (2010)

 Globalectics (by Ngugi wa Thiong'o) (2014)

Refereed papers published in English:
 
 " The Orientalist Discourse in Anglo-American Literary Criticism," Alef journal, 9, (1989), American University in Cairo, Cairo, Egypt.
- Realms of the Wasteland: Hijazi and the Metropolis, World Literature Today, University of Oklahoma, Oklahoma, USA, (Spring, 1993) 67:2.
 "Elegies Within Culture: Auden and Abu Risha," Proceedings of the International Conference: Comparative Literature In the Arab World, Centre for Comparative Linguistics and Literary Studies, Faculty of Arts, Cairo University, 20–22 December 1995 (Cairo, The Egyptian Society of Comparative Literature, 1998)
 "The Antithetical Arab: Leo Africanus and Yeats," (1996) Studies in English, (Riyadh: Research Center, College of Arts, King Saud University).
"Books and Terror: Anxieties of the Infinite in Wordsworth, Borges and Stevens," The Arab Journal for the Humanities, Kuwait University, Kuwait, (Autumn, 1997) no. 60.
"The Revulsion against Islam: Romanticist Critics and the East," Abhath Al-Yarmouk Journal, Jordan (1997), 15: 1.
- "A Mythical Rape: Rilke, Yeats, Abu-Risha," Alef journal, American University in Cairo, (1999), no. 19.
- "Tension in the House: The Contemporary Poetry of Arabia," World Literature Today, University of Oklahoma, Oklahoma, USA, (Spring, 2001) 75:2.

References

 World Literature Today (Vol. 75: 2; Spring 2001 (USA);
 Jahrbuck.Yearbook/Simon-Dubnow-Institut (Vol. 7: 2008) (Germany);
 Der Nahe Osten-ein Teil Europas? (Ex Oriente Lux, 2006) (Germany);
 Neither East Nor West: Postcolonial Essays on Literature, Culture and Religion (Sweden)

External links
website

1953 births
Members of the Consultative Assembly of Saudi Arabia
Living people
Academic staff of King Saud University
Purdue University alumni
Saudi Arabian essayists